Peter Charles Tabuns  (born October 3, 1951) is a Canadian politician who served as the interim leader of the Ontario New Democratic Party and the leader of the Opposition from 2022 to 2023. He is a member of the Legislative Assembly of Ontario, first elected in a 2006 by-election to represent the riding of Toronto—Danforth.

In 2009, he entered the party leadership convention but lost to Andrea Horwath. Following Horwath's resignation as leader after the 2022 Ontario general election, the Ontario New Democratic Party caucus unanimously recommended Tabuns' selection as the Ontario NDP's interim leader. His appointment was confirmed by the party's provincial council on June 28, 2022. He served until the election of his successor, Marit Stiles, following the leadership election.

Background 
Tabuns was born in London, Ontario, to Anton Tabuns, an auto mechanic, and his wife Sarah, who was born and raised in Liverpool, England. Anton was born and raised in Latvia, though he managed to leave his homeland after the Soviet occupation and immigrate to England. While working on a farm, fixing equipment, he met Sarah, and soon after marrying, the couple immigrated to Canada. Soon after, the family found residence with another recent immigrant. In addition to Peter, Anton and Sarah have two other children, Frank and Anna.

Tabuns attended York University, where he studied political science and was actively involved in York's student council. Tabuns was also president of Citizens for a Safe Environment, a Riverdale environmental group that lobbied the city to end garbage incineration at the Commissioners Street plant in the Port Lands. He became managing director of a housing co-op on Oak Street, and was also vice-chair of the Co-operative Housing Federation of Toronto.

He lives with Shawn Kerwin, who is a theatre designer and professor at York University. They have a son, Anton, from Tabuns' previous relationship.

Municipal politics 
Tabuns was city councillor for Ward 8 - Riverdale - of the former City of Toronto from 1990 to 1997, representing part of the Toronto-Danforth riding he now represents provincially. He was a member of the Board of Health for seven years, and was chair from 1993 to 1997. In 1995 he moved to ban smoking in shopping mall food courts. A year later the city extended the ban to include bars and restaurants.

In 1996, he supported a boycott of Harvey's restaurants because its parent company Cara Operations had donated money to the Progressive Conservative Party for the previous three years. The Board of Health initially passed the motion 7-6 but later rescinded it following a storm of protest. Tabuns was unrepentant and said that corporations must be held accountable for supporting Ontario Premier Mike Harris. Tabuns said, "What Mike Harris has done is put greased skids under the economy of this city and pushed it downhill."

In 1997 the amalgamation of Metropolitan Toronto reduced the number of councillor positions. Tabuns was forced to compete with fellow NDP councillors Pam McConnell (who had previously represented Ward 7, adjacent to Tabuns' Ward 8) and Jack Layton (who had held a seat on Metro Council representing the same area as Wards 7 and 8) for one of two council positions returned by the east-end ward. A phantom candidate named "Larry Tabin" also entered the election. It has been alleged that Tabin was enlisted as a candidate by bar and restaurant owners seeking to defeat Tabuns over his anti-smoking initiative; despite his presence on the ballot, Tabin did not actually conduct any visible campaign. In the confusion, Tabin was able to draw enough votes away from Peter Tabuns to cost Tabuns the election. Tabuns came in third, with about 200 fewer votes than McConnell.

Greenpeace 
From 1999 to 2004, Tabuns was executive director of Greenpeace Canada. Under Tabuns' leadership, the organization advocated for environmental protection, including the adoption of the Kyoto Protocol. Tabuns also served as special advisor on climate change to Jack Layton from 2004 to 2005.

Tabuns was criticized by some members of Office and Professional Employees International Union (OPEIU) local 343 (now Canadian Office and Professional Employees Union 343) in 2002, when Greenpeace terminated its door-to-door fundraising efforts and transferred foot canvassers to telephone fundraising. No layoffs occurred; however, several workers disputed Greenpeace's assertions that the new positions were of "comparable salary and benefits", and held an information picket outside Greenpeace offices. According to the union, the "circumstances surrounding the closure of the door canvass were amicably resolved".

Federal politics
Tabuns ran as the NDP candidate in the riding of Beaches—East York during the 2004 federal election. He lost the election to Liberal incumbent Maria Minna by 7,738 votes.

Provincial politics 

On February 15, 2006, the Toronto—Danforth NDP riding association nominated Tabuns as the party's candidate in the provincial by-election, to fill the vacancy caused by the resignation of former NDP Member of Provincial Parliament Marilyn Churley. Churley resigned her provincial seat in order to run in the 2006 federal election as the NDP candidate for Beaches-East York.

Tabuns' opponents in the election were former broadcaster and Liberal candidate Ben Chin, Progressive Conservative candidate Georgina Blanas and Green Party candidate Paul Charbonneau. On March 30, 2006, Tabuns won the by-election with 47.8% support from voters.

Upon being sworn in as an MPP, NDP Leader Howard Hampton reorganized his shadow cabinet and gave the rookie member a long list of portfolios, including Transportation, Environment, Public Infrastructure Renewal, Greater Toronto Area, Culture, Tourism and Recreation, Citizenship and Immigration, and Multicultural Affairs.

In October 2006, Tabuns was voted Best MPP by Now Magazine readers, for his positions on climate change, the Portlands Energy Centre, and early childhood learning centres in his constituency. Tabuns has also been known for his stance on same-sex parental rights, anti-toxics legislation and recognition of foreign credentials. In the same month, Tabuns was recognized for tabling a motion to recognize June 22, 2006 as Chinese Canadian Head Tax Redress Day.

Tabuns was re-elected in the 2007, 2011, 2014, 2018 and 2022 provincial elections.

He is currently the party's interim leader, after previously serving as the party's critic on energy and climate change and before that critic for Education and Energy issues.

2009 Leadership bid 

Following the resignation of party leader Howard Hampton in June 2008, Peter Tabuns was mentioned in the press as a likely candidate in the emerging campaign for the leadership. On October 27, 2008, Tabuns officially launched his campaign for the leadership. The party's leadership convention was held in March 2009. Tabuns lost to Andrea Horwath by a margin of 60% to 40% on the third ballot following the defeat of contenders Michael Prue and Gilles Bisson in earlier rounds.

Interim Leader 

On June 13, 2022, the 31 members of the Ontario NDP caucus elected in the 2022 Ontario general election met and unanimously endorsed Peter Tabuns to serve as interim party leader pending the outcome of its forthcoming leadership election. Following this recommendation by caucus, his appointment was confirmed by the party's provincial council on June 28, 2022. Marit Stiles became the leader following a leadership election that was held on February 4, 2023.

Electoral record 

1997 Toronto Municipal Election: Ward 25 – Don River

1994 Toronto Municipal Election: Ward 8 – Riverdale

1991 Toronto Municipal Election: Ward 8 – Riverdale

References

External links 
 
 

1951 births
Canadian environmentalists
Canadian people of English descent
Canadian people of Latvian descent
Living people
New Democratic Party candidates for the Canadian House of Commons
Leaders of the Ontario New Democratic Party
Ontario New Democratic Party MPPs
Politicians from London, Ontario
Toronto city councillors
York University alumni
21st-century Canadian politicians